Live at CBGB 1982 is a live album and DVD capturing hardcore punk/reggae group Bad Brains in concert at the historic New York City club CBGB in December 1982. The show features several tracks from the first three Bad Brains albums - Black Dots, Bad Brains, and the soon-to-be-released Rock for Light. The album also contains previously unreleased material, such as the reggae tunes "King of Glory" and "I And I Rasta."

Hardcore pioneers Minor Threat and Adam Horovitz's (Beastie Boys) first band, The Young and the Useless, opened the show.

CD Track listing
 Big Takeover  
 I    
 Jah the Conqueror  
 Supertouch/Shitfit  
 Rally Round Jah Throne   
 Right Brigade   
 F.V.K.  
 I and I Survive   
 Destroy Babylon    
 Joshua's Song  
 Unity Dub   
 The Meek Shall Inherit 
 Banned in DC   
 How Low Can a Punk Get?   
 Riot Squad   
 I and I Rasta   
 We Will Not  
 The Regulator   
 All Rise to Meet Jah

DVD track listing
 Big Takeover
 Attitude 
 I 
 I and I Rasta 
 Supertouch/Shitfit 
 King of Glory with Dave Hahn
 Right Brigade 
 F.V.K.
 Banned in D.C. 
 How Low Can a Punk Get?
 The Meek Shall Inherit
 Riot Squad 
 We Will Not 
 Coptic Times 
 At the Movies 
 Right Brigade 
 Rally Round Jah Throne 
 Redbone in the City 
 Pay to Cum 
 I and I Survive

Personnel
H.R. - vocals
Dr. Know - guitar
Darryl Jenifer - bass
Earl Hudson - drums

Bad Brains live albums
2006 live albums
2006 video albums
Live video albums
Albums recorded at CBGB
Bad Brains video albums